Thomas Smyth (1740 – 14 January 1785) was an Irish politician.

Life
He was Mayor of Limerick twice (in 1764 and 1776) and Member of Parliament for Limerick City from 1776 until his death. He was appointed High Sheriff of County Limerick for 1770. He was also Colonel of the Limerick Militia.  

He was succeeded in the constituency and in militia by his brother John Prendergast Smyth. John had also inherited the estates of their uncle, Sir Thomas Prendergast, 2nd Baronet, even though Thomas was the oldest son. John was later ennobled as the first Viscount Gort.

Family
Smyth was the eldest son of Charles Smyth, MP for Limerick City, and Elizabeth Prendergast. His paternal grandparents were Thomas Smyth, Bishop of Limerick, and Dorothea Burgh (daughter of Ulysses Burgh), and his paternal uncles included the lawyer George Smyth and Arthur Smyth, Archbishop of Dublin. His maternal grandparents were Sir Thomas Prendergast, 1st Baronet, who was killed in action at the Battle of Malplaquet in 1709, and Penelope Cadogan, sister of William Cadogan, 1st Earl Cadogan.

Smyth died unmarried at Bordeaux, but fathered four children, all of whom bore the surname Stuart, including the Indian army officer Charles "Hindoo" Stuart.

Further reading
Spurrell, J. C. In Search of Thomas Smyth, Mayor of Limerick, Irish Family History, Vol. 25 (2009).

1740 births
1785 deaths
Irish MPs 1776–1783
Irish MPs 1783–1790
Mayors of Limerick (city)
Members of the Parliament of Ireland (pre-1801) for County Limerick constituencies
High Sheriffs of County Limerick